Keapara is an Oceanic language of Papua New Guinea. It is close to, but distinct from, its neighbour Hula.

It has been strongly influenced by Papuan languages.

Dialects
The Keapara language includes several dialectal varieties: Aroma, Babaka, Kamali, Kalo, Keapara (Kerepunu), Kapari, Lalaura, Maopa, Wanigela (Waiori).

Phonology 
The following is the phonology of the Kalo dialect of Keapara:

Consonants

Vowels

References

Bibliography
Dutton, T. "Lau'una: another Austronesian remnant on the south-east coast of Papua". In Lynch, J. and Pat, F.'A. editors, Oceanic Studies: Proceedings of the First International Conference on Oceanic Linguistics. C-133:61-82. Pacific Linguistics, The Australian National University, 1996. 

Central Papuan Tip languages
Languages of Central Province (Papua New Guinea)